Beoir may refer to:

 Beoir, a member organisation of the European Beer Consumers' Union

Other languages 
 Beoir is an Irish language word for beer
 Beoir is a Shelta word for woman